Oil Change was a Canadian documentary television series, following the Edmonton Oilers. Produced by Alberta's Aquila Productions and written by Scot Morison, Oil Change featured exclusive access inside the Edmonton Oilers organization through the 2010–11 NHL season (season 1) to the 2013–14 NHL season (season 4). Don Metz was the executive producer of the series, Gord Redel was the producer, and Scot Morison was the writer/story developer.

The first season aired on TSN. Season 2 premiered locally on City owned-and-operated station CKEM-DT in Edmonton, Alberta on  October 21, 2011 and nationally on Sportsnet on October 23, 2011. Each season aired approximately once a month, until the end of the NHL regular season.

Aquila Productions announced on October 20, 2014, the series would not return for a fifth season.

Episodes

Pilot (2010)

Season 1 (2010–2011)

Season 2 (2011–2012)
 Also known as Oil Change: Overdrive.

Season 3 (2013)
 Also known as Oil Change: Game On.

Season 4 (2013–2014)
 Also known as Oil Change: All In.

International airings
NHL Network re-airs the series in the United States.

References

External links
 Oil Change page on Edmonton Oilers website

2010–11 NHL season
2011–12 NHL season
2012–13 NHL season
2013–14 NHL season
2010s Canadian sports television series
Edmonton Oilers
National Hockey League on television
Sportsnet shows
Television shows filmed in Edmonton
The Sports Network original programming
2010 Canadian television series debuts
2014 Canadian television series endings
2010s Canadian documentary television series